St. Leonard of Port Maurice, or more simply St. Leonard's, is a parish of the Roman Catholic Church in the Archdiocese of Boston. It is noted for its historic parish church located at the corner of Hanover and Prince Streets in the North End of Boston, one of the oldest churches built by Italian immigrants in the United States. The church is a pending  Boston Landmark.

History
In 1873, Archbishop Williams asked the Franciscans of the Immaculate Conception Province to minister to Boston's growing population of Italian immigrants. Fr. Angelo Conterno, OFM, founded the Saint Leonard of Port Maurice parish soon afterwards. Construction of the current building, designed in the Romanesque style by architect William Holmes, did not begin until 1885. The church in the basement opened to the public in 1891, with an estimated 20,000 parishioners. The upper church and the friary on North Bennet Street were completed in 1899. The interior, with its ornate Italian style and color scheme, was created by immigrant craftsmen who were also parishioners.

The influenza epidemic of 1918 left many North End children orphaned. Fr. Antonio Sousa, the pastor of St. Leonard's Church at the time, founded the Home for Italian Children in Jamaica Plain to care for them. The home separated from the Catholic Church in 1968 and was renamed the Italian Home for Children in 1974. It is now a residential treatment center providing clinical services for emotionally challenged children.

Today, St. Leonard of Port Maurice Parish also includes the nearby Sacred Heart Church, Saint Stephen's Church, Saint Mary's Chapel, and Saint John Catholic Elementary School. The Sacred Heart Church, built in 1833, was originally a Seamen's Bethel where the Methodist minister Rev. Edward Thompson Taylor preached. Herman Melville was a frequent visitor, and Charles Dickens visited there in 1842 to hear Taylor preach. It was purchased by Italian immigrants and became the Sacred Heart Church in 1888.

St. Leonard's Church is known for its attractive Peace Garden, and for its St. Anthony shrine, which is the oldest of its kind in Boston. Masses are held in English and Italian, with a weekly radio ministry every Tuesday on WUNR (1600 AM). The parish office is located at 14 North Bennet Street. The parish sponsors the annual St. Anthony's festival in the North End.

St. Leonard's Church has twice-hourly bells daily from 7 AM to 10 PM.

See also
 History of Italian Americans in Boston

References

External links 
 
 St. Leonard's Church video
 Sacred Heart Church
 Italian Home for Children

North End, Boston
Italian-American culture in Boston
Roman Catholic churches in Boston
Romanesque Revival architecture in Massachusetts
Roman Catholic churches completed in 1899
Religious organizations established in 1873
19th-century Roman Catholic church buildings in the United States